Angela Taylor is a scholar and former athlete.

Angela Taylor may also refer to:

 Angela Taylor (ice hockey)
 Angela Taylor (basketball)
 Police Constable Angela Rose Taylor who died from injuries caused by the Russell Street bombing
 Angella Taylor-Issajenko, Canadian athlete who competed as Angella Taylor for most of her career

See also
 Angela Owen-Taylor, Australian politician